Mount Leyli, also Leili is a  tall mountain between the Georgian provinces of Samtskhe-Javakheti and Kvemo Kartli. Leyli is second highest peak of the Javakheti Range in the Lesser Caucasus Mountains.

See also

 List of volcanoes in Georgia (country)
 Javakheti Range
 Mount Aghchala
 Mount Yemlikli

Image gallery

References 

Mountains of Georgia (country)
Volcanoes of Georgia (country)
Geography of Kvemo Kartli
Geography of Samtskhe–Javakheti
Mountains of Samtskhe-Javakheti region
Quaternary volcanoes